Raymond Cho may refer to:

Raymond Cho (politician), Canadian politician
Raymond Cho (actor), Hong Kong actor

See also
Raymond Chow (disambiguation)